Josép Robert Serra (born 13 February 1967) is a Spanish rower. He competed in the men's eight event at the 1992 Summer Olympics.

References

1967 births
Living people
Spanish male rowers
Olympic rowers of Spain
Rowers at the 1992 Summer Olympics
People from Pla de l'Estany
Sportspeople from the Province of Girona